A Practical Guide to Astral Projection is an EP and the second studio record by American rock band Nymphs. It was produced by Bill Price and released in 1992 on DGC Records. The EP consists of demos of "The Highway" and "Alright" the band made prior to being signed, a previously unreleased cover of Badfinger's "Come and Get It" plus the album versions of "Imitating Angels" and "Wasting My Days". The EP was released after the band broke up.

Track listing
All songs by Nymphs except for "Come and Get It", written by Paul McCartney
Imitating Angels - 4:28
Alright - 4:30
Come and Get It (Badfinger cover) - 3:57
Wasting My Days - 4:04
The Highway - 5:08

Personnel
Inger Lorre - Vocals
Geoff Siegel - Guitar
Alex Kirst - Drums
Sam Merrick - Guitar
Cliff D. - Bass

Additional personnel
Bill Price - mixing, producer
Earle Mankey - engineer

External links
 A Practical Guide to Astral Projection at Allmusic

The Nymphs albums
1992 EPs
Albums produced by Bill Price (record producer)
Astral projection in popular culture
DGC Records EPs